Frank H. Warder (birth date unknown - 1955) was the New York State Superintendent of Banks. Prior to that, Warder was Secretary of the New York Bryan League. He was convicted of taking a bribe and spent 3 and half years in prison Sing Sing.

Arrest, Conviction and Death 
Warder was arrested in 1929 on bribery charges after a 38-year career. Future President, and the Governor of New York State at the time, Roosevelt appointed Broderick as Successor to Warder.
Warder's wife suddenly died of heart attack on the day of her scheduled court appearance as a witness - strain of bad publicity was cited as the cause. Warder was found guilty on November 6, 1929. Warder died on March 2, 1955.

References 

Year of birth missing
1955 deaths
New York (state) politicians
New York (state) politicians convicted of crimes